Jed-Forest Sevens is an annual rugby sevens event held by Jed-Forest RFC, in Jedburgh, Scotland. The Jed-Forest Sevens was the fourth of the Border Sevens tournaments to be instated, in 1894, after the Melrose Sevens (1883), Gala Sevens (1884) and the Hawick Sevens (1885).

The Jed-Forest Sevens are traditionally the last tournament of the Kings of the Sevens competition.

2022's Jed-Forest Sevens will be played on 14 May.

Sports day
Jed-Forest RFC] introduce a sports day in 1894 featuring rugby sevens as a way to supplement the club's income at the end of the season.

Sponsorship
The Sevens tournament is now sponsored by Starrett UK. It was sponsored by RJT, Mainetti and Tennents before that.

Past winners

'A' sides are shown where a club had entered two sides in the tournament

See also
 Jed-Forest RFC
 Borders Sevens Circuit
 Scottish Rugby Union

References 

Rugby sevens competitions in Scotland
Rugby union in the Scottish Borders